A diagrid (a portmanteau of diagonal grid) is a framework of diagonally intersecting metal, concrete, or wooden beams that is used in the construction of buildings and roofs. It requires less structural steel than a conventional steel frame. Hearst Tower in New York City, designed by Norman Foster, uses 21 percent less steel than a standard design. The diagrid obviates the need for columns and can be used to make large column-free expanses of roofing. Another iconic building designed by Foster, 30 St Mary Axe, in London, UK, known as "The Gherkin", also uses the diagrid system.

British architect Ian Ritchie wrote in 2012:

Buildings utilizing diagrid 
 Shukhov Tower in Polibino, Polibino, Russia (1896)
 Shukhov Rotunda at the All-Russia exhibition, Nizhny Novgorod, Russia (1896)
 Shukhov Tower, Moscow, Russia
 Hearst Tower, New York, USA
 30 St Mary Axe, London, England
 1 The Avenue, Manchester, England
 CCTV Headquarters, Beijing, China
 The Bow, Calgary, Canada
 Seattle Central Library, Seattle, USA
 Capital Gate, Abu Dhabi, United Arab Emirates
 Aldar headquarters, Abu Dhabi, United Arab Emirates
 Guangzhou International Finance Center, Guangzhou, China
 Queen Elizabeth II Great Court at the British Museum, London, England
 Nagoya Dome, Nagoya, Japan
 Westhafen Tower, Frankfurt, Germany
 Merdeka 118, Kuala Lumpur, Malaysia
 MyZeil, Frankfurt, Germany
 The Crystal, Copenhagen, Denmark
 United Steelworkers Building, Pittsburgh, USA
 Tornado Tower, Doha, Qatar
 Newfoundland Quay, London, England
 Lotte World Tower, Seoul, Republic of Korea

See also

References

Bibliography
 Design and construction of steel diagrid structures by K. Moon, School of Architecture, Yale University
 The diagrid system of Hearst Tower by the Steel Institute of New York

Building
Construction
Building engineering
Roofs
Structural system